Moczydłowski, feminine: Moczydłowska, is a Polish-language surname. Notable people with this surname include:

Maria Moczydłowska (1886 – 1969), Polish educator and politician.
, Polish sociologist, criminologist, journalist and state official

Polish-language surnames